Porky & Daffy is a 1938 Warner Bros. Looney Tunes cartoon directed by Bob Clampett. The cartoon was released on August 6, 1938, and stars Porky Pig and Daffy Duck.

Plot
In the home of Daffy Duck and Porky Pig, Porky's relationship with Daffy is strained, as he is a lazy sloth. Porky has found an ad inviting all comers to take on a boxing rooster named The Champ. Porky has trouble waking Daffy up, but eventually does so by clanging a dinner platter over his head. This causes him to immediately go crazy and start warming up for a boxing match.

Later, at a jam-packed boxing ring, Porky volunteers Daffy to fight the Champ after all the other fighters run off scared. Despite the fact that he blows off Daffy's XXX sacks of flour (which he used to make himself look more muscular) and acts like a lion, Daffy is unfazed and simply retaliates by acting like a lion tamer, driving him back with a chair and whip. After the pelican announcer's longwinded introductions, the fight begins. (Daffy: "Sold- to the American Tabasco Company!")

In Round 1, the announcer reminds them "no hitting below the belt", so Daffy raises his shorts to cover all but his head. The Champ then blows his shorts off. Daffy flees, but with a reminder from Porky, gets on his "tricycle", wheeling through midair, and soon going so fast that the slower Champ cannot keep up, using the advantage to repeatedly punch him. Once he is out of sight, the announcer and the Champ look around for Daffy, only to discover he has hidden inside the pelican's beak. The Champ beats up the announcer to get to Daffy, finally catching him, only for the duck to fly out of the announcer's beak. The Champ then tries to Bribe Daffy with a candy cane, only for the former to clunk the latter with it. The Champ then pulls a curtain with CENSORED written. After the melee, Daffy lies there unconscious.   

With him knocked out, Porky is forced to rush back to their home to get the dinner platter to wake him up again before the ten-count. Daffy awakens in his frenzy again, and begins ferociously attacking the Champ without regard to his situation, ducking all of his blows eventually knocking him out. The announcer counts to ten in a matter of seconds, and Daffy wins the match. Daffy wakes him up by clanging the platter, and he goes into a frenzy much like Daffy did.

In other usages
In 1987, WPHL-TV Channel 17 in Philadelphia at the time issued a technical difficulty moment after a film-flutter and sound warble leading to the title-card on a colorized Sunset Productions 16mm print of Porky & Daffy.

See also
 List of Daffy Duck cartoons
 List of Porky Pig cartoons

Notes
The cartoon is also available as a bonus feature on the Angels with Dirty Faces DVD and Blu-Ray.

The cartoon is also available on the Porky Pig 101, Disc 3 DVD.

The idea of an outside power turning someone into a crazy but skilled fighter has been also seen in several Three Stooges shorts, all involving Curly Howard. The most famous is from Punch Drunks, when Curly would go fighting mad whenever he heard Pop Goes the Weasel, and Moe using this to turn him into a boxing champ. A similar idea would be used in Grips, Grunts and Groans when the smell of Wild Hyacinth would make Curly even able to beat up professional wrestlers.

This cartoon is notable for having a different version of the Looney Tunes end theme, as it was more energetic than the other times the Porky drum ending was featured. The computer-colorized version replaced that version with the 1938–1941 Looney Tunes end theme. This version would be heard again two years later in The Sour Puss, which also starred Porky Pig.

References

External links
 

1938 films
1938 animated films
1930s sports films
Looney Tunes shorts
Warner Bros. Cartoons animated short films
Films directed by Bob Clampett
American black-and-white films
1930s American animated films
Boxing animation
American boxing films
Daffy Duck films
Porky Pig films
Films scored by Carl Stalling